Air Vice Marshal Henry Rudolph Graham,  (28 March 1910 – 14 February 1987) was a senior Royal Air Force officer.

RAF career
Graham was commissioned into the Royal Air Force on 10 April 1931. He served in the Second World War as officer commanding, No. 7 Squadron from April 1941, Command Navigation Officer at Headquarters RAF Bomber Command from July 1942 and as officer commanding, RAF Wyton from June 1943 before becoming officer commanding, RAF Kirmington from October 1943.

After the war he became Head of Flying Control, Headquarters RAF Transport Command in July 1945, Director of Operations in April 1952 and Air Officer Commanding, No. 23 Group in January 1956. His last appointment was as Air Officer Administration at RAF Flying Training Command in January 1958 before retiring in April 1962.

References

1910 births
1987 deaths
Royal Air Force air marshals
Companions of the Order of the Bath
Commanders of the Order of the British Empire
Companions of the Distinguished Service Order
Recipients of the Distinguished Flying Cross (United Kingdom)